The Bonneville Expedition may refer to:

 Bonneville Expedition of 1832, an expedition of Oregon Country
 Bonneville Expedition of 1857, American military operation during the Apache Wars

American frontier